Providence Friends Meetinghouse is a Historic Quaker meeting house at 105 North Providence Road in Media, Delaware County, Pennsylvania, United States.  The first mention of the Providence Friends meeting is in 1696 when it was recorded that a meeting will be held "At Thomas Minshall's every First and Fourth day."  The meeting was moved from Thomas Minshall's house in 1700 to a log building which was replaced by a stone structure in 1727.  In 1753, the previous stone structure was removed and replaced with a larger stone building that stands today.

John Martin Broomall, the U.S. Congressman from Pennsylvania's 7th congressional district was known to attend the Providence Friends Meetinghouse and spoke there several times.

The Providence Friends Meetinghouse is an active worship center.

References

Quaker meeting houses in Pennsylvania
Churches completed in 1753
Churches in Delaware County, Pennsylvania
18th-century Quaker meeting houses